Noisy-le-Grand–Mont d'Est is a train station in Noisy-le-Grand, Seine-Saint-Denis, under Les Arcades department store.

Description 
The station is in the Mont d'Est district of Noisy-le-Grand, under Les Arcades department store. One can walk from the station to the mall without going outside.

History 
The station opened in 1977 as RER line A was officially created.

During the 1990s, a SK people mover was supposed to link the station and office blocks, but the project failed. However, the line was created and the ghost station still exists.

Traffic 
, the estimated annual attendance by the RATP Group was 7,609,131 passengers.

Transport service

Train 
Noisy-le-Grand–Mont d'Est is served by RER line A. The average waiting time for trains to Paris and Marne-la-Vallée–Chessy is 10 minutes. During peak hours, some trains from Paris terminate there.

Bus connections 

The station is served by several buses:

Gallery

References

Réseau Express Régional stations
Railway stations in France opened in 1977
Railway stations in Seine-Saint-Denis